Gobbler may refer to:

 Gobbler, another name for a male turkey
 Gobbler, Arkansas, a community in the United States
 Gobbler (video game), a 1981 clone of Pac-Man
 The Gobbler, a former motel, supper club, and roadside attraction in Johnson Creek, Wisconsin, United States
 Gobblers, the General Oblation Board, a child-stealing religious group in Philip Pullman's novel trilogy His Dark Materials.

See also